Barnor is a surname. Notable people with the surname include: 

James Barnor (born 1929), Ghanaian photographer
Ricky Barnor (born 1943), Ghanaian boxer